The State Tax Service under the Ministry of Economy of the Republic of Azerbaijan is a state body that ensures state control over the timely and full collection of taxes, compulsory state social insurance, unemployment insurance, and compulsory medical insurance, as well as other compulsory payments within the framework of a single financial and budgetary policy, which are assigned by law and an act of the President of the Republic of Azerbaijan to the competence of the Service.

History 
On October 23, 2019, the State Tax Service has been established under the Ministry of Economy of Azerbaijan based on the Decree of the President of Azerbaijan on expanding the functions and structure of the Ministry of Economy.

On May 12, 2020, by the decree of the President Ilham Aliyev the regulations on the State tax service were approved.

On July 3, 2020, Ilham Aliyev has signed a decree on the amendments to the Regulation on the State Tax Service under the Ministry of Economy of Azerbaijan.  

On May 6, 2021 Orkhan Nazarli has been appointed to the post of deputy head of the State Tax Service under the Ministry of Economy of Azerbaijan.

Duties 
In accordance with the directions of activity defined by the statute of the State Tax Service, the duties of the service are as follows:

 Participate in the preparation of projects of normative legal acts regulating relations in the field of tax relations, as well as in the field of calculation and payment of mandatory state social insurance, unemployment insurance and compulsory health insurance premiums, give feedback and suggestions on them
 Participate in preparing of development programs in the relevant field
 Participate in the preparation of proposals on regulating relations in the field of taxation between the Republic of Azerbaijan and other countries 
 Ensure supervision over the correct calculation, timely and full collection of tax collection, compulsory state social insurance, unemployment insurance, compulsory medical insurance, as well as other compulsory payments referred to the competence of the Service by law and act of the President of the Republic of Azerbaijan
 Keep a record of calculated and received on purpose taxes and fees compulsory social insurance, unemployment insurance and compulsory medical insurance and to inform the Ministry with a aim to submitting a report to the President of Azerbaijan, Cabinet of Ministers of Azerbaijan and the Ministry of Finance of Azerbaijan
 Control the income from the lease of other lands in state ownership, except lands that are in use by legal entities, state-owned, or state owned land on which is projected the construction of public facilities, enterprises and objects constructed by legal entities and individuals
 Implement state supervision in the field of accounting in cases stated by the Law of Azerbaijan "About accounting"
 Keep records of taxpayers, their branches, representative offices or other divisions (objects), cash registers, as well as persons who use land suitable for agriculture that they own for the purposes of mandatory state social insurance
 Ensure the production of control stamps in accordance with the laws of Azerbaijan "About freedom of religion" and  "About medicines"
 Draw up forms of reports, declarations and other documents related to the calculation and payment of taxes, mandatory state social payments, unemployment insurance premiums and mandatory medical insurance, as well as other mandatory payments referred by law and the act of the President of Azerbaijan to the competence of the Service
 Сonsider requests in connection with activities in accordance with the laws of Azerbaijan "On citizens appeals", “On administrative proceedings“ and  "On access to information" and take measures in accordance with the procedures established by law
 Coordinate the work of institutions that are part of the service structure and subordinate institutions that are not part of its structure, and monitor their activities
 Perform other duties established by the Tax code and acts of the President of Azerbaijan etc.

Rights 
In accordance with the statute of the State Tax Service, it has the following rights to perform its duties:

 Тo make proposals to the Ministry on the implementation of reforms in the relevant field
 Take an initiative before the Ministry in the field of international agreements of Azerbaijan İn the relevant areas
 By agreement with the ministry, to participate in international events and organize such events, as well as conferences, seminars and training courses in the country or abroad
 Submit proposals to the Ministry for the creation, reorganization and liquidation of subordinate institutions that are not part of its structure
 Submission of proposals to the Ministry in connection with the establishment of a periodical press, deal with issue of special bulletins and other publications in accordance with the procedure established by the Law of  Azerbaijan ”About mass media"
 Use the rights defined by the Tax code while implementing tax control measures
 Ensure the implementation of control in the field of prevention of deliberate destruction, falsification, illegal manufacture, use and sale of control marks
 Carry out operational and investigative activities in cases and in accordance with the procedure established by the Law of Azerbaijan "On operational and investigative activities"
 Implement investigation procedures in accordance with the procedure established by the criminal procedure code of Azerbaijan
 Consider cases of administrative violations; impose administrative penalties in connection with violation of the requirements of legislation in the relevant area.

Structure 
Regarding to organizational structure, the State tax service of Azerbaijan includes 10 units

 State Tax Service of Nakhchivan AR
 Main Department Of Primary Investigation Of Tax Crimes
 Main Department Of National Income
 Main Department of Local Revenues of Baku City
 Baku city Main Department on Work with Small Entrepreneurship
 Main Department of Control over İmport-Export Operations
 Territorial Main Tax Departments, Departments
 District Tax Divisions
Subordinate institution that is not part of the structure of the State Tax Service under the Ministry of Economy:
 Training Centre

Training Center 
Training Centre of the State Tax Service was established on July 19, 2001, according to Decree No.90 of the Cabinet of ministers of Azerbaijan dated on June 5, 2002, based on Decree No.539 about application of the Law of Azerbaijan on approval of the Regulation "About service in state tax authorities" signed by President Heydar Aliyev.

A new Training Center complex was built in the village of Nagarakhana of the Shamakhi region by order of Ilham Aliyev.  On September 13, 2011, a complex of modern architectural style was opened with the participation of President.

The aim of the center is to carry out educational processes to improve the level of knowledge and vocational training of the employees of tax authorities, ensure practical work and management ability, master new technologies and techniques, as well as adapting to constantly changing working conditions.

Programs for improvement of tax administration 

 State program for improving tax administration in the Republic of Azerbaijan
 Concept of development of services provided to taxpayers by tax authorities

See also 
Ministry of Taxes (Azerbaijan)

Tax Code of Azerbaijan

Ministry of Economy (Azerbaijan)

References 

Economy of Azerbaijan
2019 establishments in Azerbaijan